Brkich is a surname. Notable people with the surname include:

Amber Brkich (born 1978), American television personality
Greg Brkich (born 1958), Canadian provincial politician

See also
Brkic, surname of the same origin